The Outer Limits is a television series that originally aired on Showtime, Syfy, and in syndication between 1995 & 2002. The series is a revival of the original The Outer Limits series that aired from 1963 to 1965.

The Outer Limits is an anthology of distinct story episodes, sometimes with a plot twist at the end. The revival series maintained an anthology format but occasionally featured recurring story arcs that were then tied together during season-finale clip shows.

History
After an attempt to bring back The Outer Limits during the early 1980s, it was finally relaunched in 1995. The success of television speculative fiction such as Star Trek: The Next Generation, The X-Files, and anthology shows such as Tales from the Crypt convinced rights holder Metro-Goldwyn-Mayer to revive The Outer Limits. A deal was made with Trilogy Productions, the company behind such cinema hits as Backdraft & Robin Hood: Prince of Thieves. The show would run on the pay-TV channel Showtime (Trilogy, a Los Angeles & Canada-based company, is credited with creating the 1995 series).

The episodes appeared in syndication the following season (the same arrangement as MGM/Showtime series Stargate SG-1 & Poltergeist: The Legacy). It continued on Showtime until 2001, when Sci-Fi quietly took over production for the seventh & final season. As a result, that season, unlike the previous ones, was completely free of any swearing or nudity. It was canceled in 2002, after a total of 152 episodes — far more than the original incarnation of the show. In the revived show, the Control Voice was supplied by Kevin Conway. The new series distanced itself from the "monster of the week" mandate that had characterized the original series from its inception; while there were plenty of aliens & monsters, they dramatized a specific scientific concept and its effect on humanity. Examples of this include "Dark Rain" (biochemical warfare causing worldwide sterility), "Final Exam" (discovery of practical cold fusion power), "A Stitch in Time" (a time traveler tinkers with history), as well as two episodes ("Unnatural Selection" & "Criminal Nature") revolving around a human mutation known as Genetic Rejection Syndrome (humans mutating into violent creatures) as a result of an outlawed eugenics attempt to create superior children.

Production
The series was filmed in Vancouver, British Columbia and Victoria, British Columbia. Stories by Harlan Ellison, A. E. van Vogt, Eando Binder, Larry Niven, Richard Matheson, George R.R. Martin, Stephen King, and James Patrick Kelly were adapted.

Leslie Stevens was a program consultant for the first four seasons (until his death), while Joseph Stefano served as an executive consultant and later senior advisor throughout the whole series. Stefano also remade his episode "A Feasibility Study", retitling it "Feasibility Study" for the third season. John Van Tongeren & Mark Mancina composed new music different from that of Dominic Frontiere & Harry Lubin. John Van Tongeren scored ten episodes for the first season and continued through season 6. The musical theme for the modern Outer Limits series is credited to John Van Tongeren & Mark Mancina.

In most seasons, there was a clip show that intertwined the plots of several of the show's episodes (see "The Voice of Reason" for an example). At each commercial interval, the Control Voice can be heard saying "The Outer Limits...please stand by".

A number of episodes from seasons 1–6 feature nudity & other adult content. Though originally broadcast uncensored, those episodes have been edited for commercial syndication.

Episodes

Home media
Between 2002 & 2006, six themed DVD anthologies of The Outer Limits, with six episodes each, were released by MGM in the US: Aliens Among Us, Death & Beyond, Fantastic Androids & Robots, Mutation & Transformation, Sex & Science Fiction, and Time Travel & Infinity. These DVDs all contain the original uncut episodes, as originally aired, and were collected in a box set, The Outer Limits: The New Series (2006). The Aliens & Sex titles were also released by MGM in the UK & Benelux (2005).

Aliens Among Us
S01E13: "Quality of Mercy"
S02E15: "Afterlife"
S05E04: "The Grell"
S04E06: "Relativity Theory"
S07E09: "Alien Shop"
S02E06: "Beyond the Veil"
Death & Beyond
S01E04: "The Second Soul"
S05E05: "The Other Side"
S03E11: "New Lease"
S05E18: "Essence of Life"
S07E22: "Human Trials"
S04E25: "Black Box"
Fantastic Androids & Robots
S01E18: "I, Robot"
S04E02: "The Hunt"
S02E02: "Resurrection"
S03E07: "The Camp"
S06E12: "Glitch"
S05E03: "Small Friends"
Mutation & Transformation
S01E14: "The New Breed"
S05E14: "Descent"
S04E13: "The Joining"
S03E12: "Double Helix"
S06E02: "The Gun"
S05E17: "The Inheritors"
Sex & Science Fiction
S01E16: "Caught in the Act"
S03E01: "Bits of Love"
S01E02: "Valerie 23"
S05E07: "The Human Operators"
S06E03: "Skin Deep"
S07E12: "Flower Child"
Time Travel & Infinity
S02E01: "A Stitch in Time"
S05E12: "Tribunal"
S06E17: "Gettysburg"
S07E15: "Time to Time"
S05E16: "Déjà Vu"
S07E02: "Patient Zero"

Season 1 was released uncut and with extra features on DVD in the US (MGM, 2005), UK (20th Century Fox, 2007), and Germany (Fox/MGM, 2008). Because sales of the set did not meet expectations, no further seasons were released.

In 2010, Canada's Alliance Home Entertainment released all seven seasons on DVD. Season 1 mirrored the content of the earlier MGM set, while season 2 was also uncensored, with the exception of one episode, "Paradise". Seasons 3–6 all contain numerous censored episodes, and Season 7 contains the original unedited episodes, as unlike the previous seasons, it was produced with no nudity or swearing.

In 2013, TGG Direct released the seventh season in the US, again unedited but of marginally inferior visual quality than the Alliance season 7 DVDs. The 5-disc set is titled The Outer Limits: The Complete Final Season, and, in 2014, it was split and re-released as a 3-disc Volume One & 2-disc Volume Two sets.

Until June 2020, all seven seasons of the series were available uncut on Hulu, until January 2021 and selectively edited on Amazon Video, and seasons 1-7 are uncut on "The Roku channel" on Roku devices.

Reception

Tie-in books
Between 1996 & 1997, Prima Publishing published three books which served as compilations of mostly prose adaptations for episodes from the 1963 & 1995 series. 

Between 1997 & 1999, a series of books that were based on the show but aimed towards younger readers was published by Tor Books, penned by genre fiction author John Peel. The first, The Zanti Misfits, was a loose adaptation of the eponymous 1963 series episode, while the second was based on the episode The Choice from the new series. The other ten books were original stories.

The Zanti Misfits
The Choice
The Time Shifter
The Lost
The Invaders
The Innocent
The Vanished
The Nightmare
Beware the Metal Children
Alien Invasion from Hollyweird
The Payback
The Change

Author Stan Timmons also wrote two tie-in original novels in 2003 entitled Always Darkest & Dark Matters respectively.

Other Media

An MMO for the reboot was planned under the title The Outer Limits On-Line. MGM was working with Worlds Inc.

In 2014, it was reported that a feature film directed by Scott Derrickson based on the series was in development. As of April 2019, a revival was in the works at a premium cable network.

Theme park attractions
Two identical indoor roller coasters named The Outer Limits: Flight of Fear opened in 1996 at Paramount's Kings Dominion in Richmond, Virginia, and Paramount's Kings Island in Cincinnati, Ohio. Loosely based on several episodes of The Outer Limits, both rides are heavily themed to an alien invasion, with riders entering the fictional Federal Bureau of Paranormal Activity and eventually boarding an alien ship. Although the Paramount Parks were purchased by Cedar Fair Entertainment Company in 2006, both rides continue to operate with most of their original theming still intact, minus the Outer Limits branding.

See also

 The Outer Limits (1963 TV series)
 List of The Outer Limits (1963 TV series) episodes
 Science fiction on television

References

External links
 

1990s Canadian anthology television series
1990s American horror television series
2000s American horror television series
1990s American science fiction television series
2000s American science fiction television series
1995 American television series debuts
2002 American television series endings
1990s Canadian science fiction television series
2000s Canadian science fiction television series
1995 Canadian television series debuts
2002 Canadian television series endings
American horror fiction television series
Canadian horror fiction television series
Dark fantasy television series
Primetime Emmy Award-winning television series
Saturn Award-winning television series
Showtime (TV network) original programming
Television series reboots
Television series by MGM Television
Television series by Alliance Atlantis
Space adventure television series
Syfy original programming
English-language television shows
1990s American anthology television series
American fantasy television series
Television series about alien visitations
Canadian fantasy television series
Philosophy of artificial intelligence
Science fiction anthology television series
Television shows filmed in Vancouver
Television shows filmed in Victoria, British Columbia